Chah Dadkhoda District is a district (bakhsh) in Qaleh Ganj County, Kerman Province, Iran. At the 2006 census, its population was 23,641, in 5,111 families.  The district has no cities.  The district has three rural districts (dehestan): Chah Dadkhoda Rural District, Marz Rural District, and Rameshk Rural District.

Cereals, sesame and dates are major plants grown in this area. The main source of irrigation is underground water, with some seasonal rivers that flow and end in Jaz-e-Moryan.

References 

Qaleh Ganj County
Districts of Kerman Province